Zaboršt pri Šentvidu is a settlement northeast of Šentvid pri Stični in the Municipality of Ivančna Gorica in central Slovenia. The area is part of the historical region of Lower Carniola. The municipality is now included in the Central Slovenia Statistical Region.

Name
The name of the settlement was changed from Zaboršt to Zaboršt pri Šentvidu in 1953. In the past the German name was Saworst.

Cultural heritage
A small roadside chapel-shrine west of the settlement is dedicated to the Sacred Heart of Jesus and was built in the early 20th century.

References

External links
Zaboršt pri Šentvidu on Geopedia

Populated places in the Municipality of Ivančna Gorica